Rasim ( / Rāsim) is a masculine given name of Arabic origin meaning "planner", "architect". People named Rasim
 Rasim Başak, Azerbaijani-Turkish basketballer
 Rasim Delić (1949–2010), Bosnian Army general
 Rasim Kara, Turkish goalkeeper
 Rasim Khutov, Russian footballer
 Rasim Ozan Kütahyalı, Turkish journalist
 Rasim Ljajić, Serbian politician
 Rasim Tagirbekov, Russian footballer

Bosnian masculine given names
Turkish masculine given names